This is a list of reptiles of Europe. It includes all reptiles currently found in Europe. It does not include species found only in captivity or extinct in Europe, except where there is some doubt about this, nor (with few exceptions) does it currently include species introduced in recent decades. Each species is listed, with its binomial name and notes on its distribution where this is limited.
Also this list is incomplete.

Summary of 2006 IUCN Red List categories.
Conservation status - IUCN Red List of Threatened Species:
 - extinct,  - extinct in the wild
 - critically endangered,  - endangered,  - vulnerable
 - near threatened,  - least concern
 - data deficient,  - not evaluated
(v. 2013.2, the data is current as of March 5, 2014)

Turtles

Family: Testudinidae (tortoises)
Subfamily: Testudininae
Hermann's tortoise, Testudo hermanni  (Southern Europe)
Spur-thighed tortoise, Testudo graeca  (Southern Europe)
Marginated tortoise, Testudo marginata  (Southern Europe)
Horsfield's tortoise, Testudo horsfieldi  (Russia)

Family: Emydidae (pond turtles)
Subfamily: Emydinae
European pond terrapin, Emys orbicularis 
Sicilian pond turtle, Emys trinacris  (Sicily)
Subfamily: Deirochelyinae
Red-eared slider, Trachemys scripta  (non-native)
Painted turtle, Chrysemys picta  (introduced to Spain and Germany)

Family: Geoemydidae
Subfamily: Geoemydinae
Spanish pond turtle, Mauremys leprosa (Spain, Portugal, France)
Balkan pond turtle, Mauremys rivulata (south-eastern Europe, Turkey)
Caspian turtle, Mauremys caspica (Southern Europe)

Family: Cheloniidae
Subfamily: Carettinae
Loggerhead sea turtle, Caretta caretta  (Southern Europe)
Kemp's ridley sea turtle, Lepidochelys kempii 
Subfamily: Cheloniinae
Green turtle, Chelonia mydas  (Southern Europe)
Hawksbill sea turtle, Eretmochelys imbricata  (in Europe Great Britain, Portugal)

Family: Dermochelyidae
Leatherback turtle, Dermochelys coriacea  (Northwest Atlantic Ocean subpopulation)

Family: Trionychidae (softshells)
Subfamily: Trionychinae
Nile soft-shelled turtle, Trionyx triunguis (Greece)

Amphisbaenia, lizards and snakes

Amphisbaenians
Family: Blanidae (Mediterranean worm lizards)
Iberian worm lizard, Blanus cinereus  (Iberia) and:
Vandelli's worm lizard, Blanus vandellii (Iberia)
Anatolian worm lizard, Blanus strauchi  (Aegean islands, southern Anatolia and Syria)
Blanus mariae (Portugal)
Blanus tingitanus  (Ceuta in northern Africa - Spain)

Family: Trogonophidae (Palearctic worm lizards)

Lizards
Family: Agamidae (agamas)
Subfamily: Agaminae

Stellion, Laudakia stellio (Greek islands) and:
Cyprus rock agama, Laudakia cypriaca  (Cyprus)
Caucasian agama, Paralaudakia caucasia (Ukraine and Russia)
Steppe agama, Trapelus sanguinolentus (Russia, Kazakhstan)
Spotted toadhead agama, Phrynocephalus guttatus  (Russia, Kazakhstan)
European toad-headed agama, Phrynocephalus helioscopus  (Ukraine and Russia)
Secret toadhead agama, Phrynocephalus mystaceus (Russia, Kazakhstan)
Psammophilus dorsalis  (Germany - introduced)

Family: Chamaeleonidae (chameleons)
Mediterranean chameleon, Chamaeleo chamaeleon  (southern Europe)
African chameleon, Chamaeleo africanus (Greece)

Family: Dactyloidae (anoles and related species)
Green anole, Anolis carolinensis  (Spain - introduced)

Family: Gekkonidae
Caspian straight-fingered gecko, Alsophylax pipiens  (Russia)
Caspian naked-fingered gecko, Tenuidactylus caspius  (Russia, Georgia)
Kotschy's naked-toed gecko, Mediodactylus kotschyi  (southern Europe) and:
Barton's thin-toed gecko, Mediodactylus (kotschyi) bartoni (Crete island in Greece)
Mediterranean thin-toed gecko, Mediodactylus (kotschyi) danilewskii (south-eastern Europe)
Mediterranean thin-toed gecko, Mediodactylus (kotschyi) oertzeni (Dodecanese islands in Greece)
Caucasian gecko, Mediodactylus russowii  (in Europe southern Russia, extirpated)
Mediterranean house gecko, Hemidactylus turcicus  (southern Europe)

Family: Phyllodactylidae
Gomero wall gecko, Tarentola gomerensis  (Spain)
Moorish gecko, Tarentola mauritanica  (southern Europe)

Family: Sphaerodactylidae
European leaf-toed gecko, Euleptes europaea  (France, Italy, Tunisia, Mediterranean islands)

Family: Lacertidae (wall or true lizards)
Subfamily: Gallotiinae
Large psammodromus, Psammodromus algirus  (Conigli islet near Lampedusa island)
Psammodromus jeanneae  (Spain, France)
Psammodromus manuelae  (Spain, Portugal)
Spanish psammodromus, Psammodromus hispanicus  (Spain and France) and:
East Iberian psammodromus, Psammodromus (hispanicus) edwardsianus (Spain and France)
Psammodromus occidentalis (Spain)
Subfamily: Lacertinae
Tribe: Eremiadini
Red-tailed spiny-footed lizard, Acanthodactylus erythrurus  (Africa and Southern Europe)
Steppe-runner, Eremias arguta (south-eastern Europe and Russia)
Rapid racerunner, Eremias velox (southern Russia)
Snake-eyed lizard, Ophisops elegans (Mediterranean and Central Asia)
Acanthodactylus schreiberi  (Cyprus in Asia - Greece, Turkey)
Tribe: Lacertini
Blue-throated keeled lizard, Algyroides nigropunctatus  (south-eastern Europe)
Greek algyroides, Algyroides moreoticus  (Greek islands)
Fitzinger's algyroides, Algyroides fitzingeri  (Corsica, Sardinia)
Spanish algyroides, Algyroides marchi  (Spain)
Iberian emerald lizard, Lacerta schreiberi  (Iberian Peninsula)
Balkan green lizard, Lacerta trilineata  (south-eastern Europe) and:
Rhodos green lizard, Lacerta (trilineata) diplochondrodes (Rhodos island in Greece)
Tinos green lizard, Lacerta (trilineata) citrovittata (Tinos island in Greece)
European green lizard, Lacerta viridis 
Western green lacerta, Lacerta bilineata 
Sand lizard, Lacerta agilis 
Mosor rock lizard, Lacerta mosorensis  (Balkans)
Greek rock lizard, Lacerta graeca  (Greece)
Caucasus emerald lizard, Lacerta strigata  (Russia, Georgia, Turkey)
Medium lizard, Lacerta media  (Russia, Georgia, Turkey)
Viviparous lizard, Zootoca vivipara  and:
Zootoca carniolica  (Slovenia, Italy, Austria, Croatia)
Bedriaga's rock lizard, Archaeolacerta bedriagae  (Corsica, Sardinia)
Iberian rock lizard, Iberolacerta monticola  (Iberian Peninsula)
Pyrenean rock lizard, Iberolacerta bonnali  (France, Spain)
Aran rock lizard, Iberolacerta aranica  (France, Spain)
Aurelio's rock lizard, Iberolacerta aurelioi  (Andorra, France, Spain)
Horvath's rock lizard, Iberolacerta horvathi  (central and southern Europe)
Iberolacerta cyreni  (Spain)
Iberolacerta galani  (Spain)
Iberolacerta martinezricai  (Spain)
Prokletije rock lizard, Dinarolacerta montenegrina  (Montenegro)
Anatolian rock lizard, Anatololacerta anatolica  (formerly in Anatololacerta danfordi, Greece, Turkey)
Anatololacerta oertzeni  (Greece, Turkey) and:
Anatololacerta pelasgiana (Greece, Turkey)
Anatololacerta finikensis  (Turkey, Greece)
Darevskia praticola  (Balkans, Russia, Georgia) and:
Meadow lizard, Darevskia (praticola) pontica (Romania, Balkans, Georgia, Turkey)
Darevskia saxicola  (Russia, Georgia, Turkey)
Darevskia caucasica  (Russia, Georgia)
Darevskia rudis  (Russia, Georgia, Turkey)
Armenian rock lizard, Darevskia armeniaca  (Ukraine - introduced, Georgia, Turkey)
Darevskia lindholmi (Ukraine)
Darevskia dahli  (Ukraine, Georgia)
Darevskia derjugini  (Russia, Georgia)
Darevskia alpina  (Russia, Georgia)
Brauner's rock lizard, Darevskia brauneri  (Ukraine, Russia, Georgia, Turkey) and:
Szczerbak's lizard, Darevskia (brauneri) szczerbaki (Russia)
Dagestan lizard, Darevskia daghestanica  (Russia, Georgia)
Common wall lizard, Podarcis muralis 
Iberian wall lizard, Podarcis hispanicus  (Iberian peninsula, France, northwestern Africa) and:
Columbretes wall lizard, Podarcis liolepis (Iberian peninsula, France)
Podarcis galerai  (Spain)
Carbonell's wall lizard, Podarcis carbonelli  (Iberian Peninsula)
Bocage's wall lizard, Podarcis bocagei  (Spain, France)
Lilford's wall lizard, Podarcis lilfordi  (Spain)
Ibiza wall lizard, Podarcis pityusensis  (Spain)
Tyrrhenian wall lizard, Podarcis tiliguerta  (Sardinia, Corsica)
Italian wall lizard, Podarcis siculus  (Italy and south-eastern Europe, introduced to Spain) and:
Pontian wall lizard, Podarcis latastei  (Italy)
Sicilian wall lizard, Podarcis waglerianus  (Italy)
Aeolian wall lizard, Podarcis raffonei  (Italy)
Maltese wall lizard, Podarcis filfolensis  (Malta)
Sharp-snouted rock lizard, Podarcis oxycephala  (Balkans)
Dalmatian wall lizard, Podarcis melisellensis  (Balkans)
Balkan wall lizard, Podarcis tauricus  (south-eastern Europe and Russia) and:
Skyros wall lizard, Podarcis gaigeae 
Ionian wall lizard, Podarcis ionicus  (Greece)
Erhard's wall lizard, Podarcis erhardii  (south-eastern Europe) and:
Podarcis cretensis  (Greece)
Peloponnese wall lizard, Podarcis peloponnesiacus  (Peloponnese)
Milos wall lizard, Podarcis milensis  (Greece)
Podarcis vaucheri  (Spain, Portugal)
Podarcis guadarramae (Spain, Portugal)
Podarcis virescens (Spain, Portugal)
Podarcis levendis  (Greece)
Moroccan rock lizard, Scelarcis perspicillata  (Menorca - Spain, introduced)
Phoenicolacerta troodica  (Cyprus in Asia - Greece, Turkey)
Ocellated lizard, Timon lepidus  (south-western Europe) and:
Sierra Nevada lizard, Timon nevadensis (Spain)
Timon tangitanus  (Spain - North African enclaves of Ceuta and Melilla, old unconfirmed records)

Family: Scincidae (skinks)
Subfamily: Scincinae
European snake-eyed skink, Ablepharus kitaibelii  (south-eastern Europe)
Budak's snake-eyed skink, Ablepharus budaki (Greece - Cyprus, Turkey)
Ocellated skink, Chalcides ocellatus (Greece, Sicily and Sardinia)
Bedriaga's skink, Chalcides bedriagai  (Iberian Peninsula)
Western three-toed skink, Chalcides striatus  (France, Italy, Iberian Peninsula)
Italian three-toed skink, Chalcides chalcides  (France, Italy)
Limbless skink, Ophiomorus punctatissimus  (Greece, Turkey)
Schneider's skink, Eumeces schneiderii (Russia, Turkey)
Subfamily: Lygosomatinae / Family: Mabuyidae
Bridled mabuya, Trachylepis vittata  (Cyprus in Asia - Greece, Turkey)
Levant skink, Heremites auratus  (few islands in Greece, Turkey)
Santo Antão skink, Chioninia fogoensis   (Madeira - Introduced)

Family: Anguidae
Subfamily: Anguinae
Common slowworm, Anguis fragilis
Peloponnese slowworm, Anguis cephalonnica  (Greece)
Italian slowworm, Anguis veronensis (Italy, south-eastern France)
Eastern slowworm, Anguis colchica
Greek slowworm, Anguis graeca
European glass lizard, Ophisaurus apodus (south-eastern Europe)

Snakes
Family: Typhlopidae (blind snakes)
Worm snake, Xerotyphlops vermicularis (south-eastern Europe)

Family: Boidae (boas)
Subfamily: Erycinae/Erycidae
Sand boa, Eryx jaculus (south-eastern Europe)
Dwarf sand boa, Eryx miliaris (in Europe southern Russia)

Family: Colubridae (colubrids)
Subfamily: Colubrinae
Western whip snake, Hierophis viridiflavus  (south-western Europe, Italy, Switzerland and Slovenia)
Caspian whipsnake, Dolichophis caspius (south-eastern Europe, Turkey)
Large whip snake, Dolichophis jugularis  (south-eastern Europe)
Red-bellied racer, Dolichophis schmidti  (Russia, Turkey, Georgia)
Horseshoe whip snake, Hemorrhois hippocrepis  (Italy, Iberian Peninsula)
Spotted whip snake, Hemorrhois ravergieri (Greece, Turkey, Georgia)
Algerian whip snake, Hemorrhois algirus  (Malta)
Coin snake, Hemorrhois nummifer (has been mentioned from European Turkey but actual presence in Europe remains unconfirmed and demands substantiation)
Red whip snake, Platyceps collaris  (Bulgaria, Turkey)
Dahl's whip snake, Platyceps najadum  (south-eastern Europe)
Balkan whip snake, Hierophis gemonensis  (south-eastern Europe)
Cyprus whip snake, Hierophis cypriensis  (Cyprus in Asia - Greece, Turkey)
Asia Minor dwarf racer, Eirenis modestus  (Greece, Russia, Turkey, Georgia)
Collared dwarf racer, Eirenis collaris  (Bulgaria, Turkey, Georgia)
Four-lined snake, Elaphe quatuorlineata  (south-eastern Europe)
Blotched snake, Elaphe sauromates (eastern and south-eastern Europe) and:
Urartian rat snake, Elaphe urartica (eastern Europe)
Steppes ratsnake, Elaphe dione (Ukraine, Russia, Georgia, Kazakhstan)
Beauty snake, Elaphe taeniura   (Introduced to Belgium and Netherlands)
Slender racer, Orientocoluber spinalis (southern Russia)
Ladder snake, Rhinechis scalaris  (Iberian Peninsula, France)
Transcaucasian rat snake, Zamenis hohenackeri  (Russia, Georgia, Turkey)
Leopard snake, Zamenis situla  (southern Europe)
Aesculapian snake, Zamenis longissimus 
Italian Aesculapian snake, Zamenis lineatus  (Italy)
Smooth snake, Coronella austriaca
Southern smooth snake, Coronella girondica  (Iberian Peninsula, France, Italy)
European cat snake, Telescopus fallax  (south-eastern Europe)
False smooth snake, Macroprotodon brevis  (Iberian peninsula)
False smooth snake, Macroprotodon cucullatus  (Iberian peninsula) and:
Macroprotodon mauritanicus  (Mallorca and Menorca, introduced)
Subfamily: Natricinde/Natricinae
Viperine water snake, Natrix maura 
Grass snake, Natrix natrix  (ssp. cetti: ,) and:
Iberian grass snake, Natrix (natrix) astreptophora (Iberian Peninsula, France)
Barred grass snake, Natrix helvetica (western and southern Europe)
Dice snake, Natrix tessellata 
Large-headed water snake, Natrix megalocephala  (Russia, Turkey, Georgia)

Family: Lamprophiidae
Subfamily: Psammophiinae
Montpellier snake, Malpolon monspessulanus  (southwestern Europe)
Eastern Montpellier snake, Malpolon insignitus (southeastern Europe)

Family: Viperidae
Subfamily: Viperinae
Ottoman viper, Montivipera xanthina  (Greece)
Caucasus viper, Vipera kaznakovi  (Russia, Georgia, Turkey)
Orsini's viper, meadow viper, Vipera ursinii  (ssp. moldavica: ,) (south-eastern France, central Italy, west Balkans, northern Greece, Hungary, Romania) and:
Greek meadow viper, Vipera (ursinii) graeca (Albania, Greece)
European adder, Vipera berus  and:
Vipera walser (Italy)
Seoane's viper, Vipera seoanei  (Iberia)
Asp viper, Vipera aspis  (south-western Europe, Italy and Switzerland)
Lataste's viper, Vipera latastei  (Iberia)
Nose-horned viper, Vipera ammodytes  (south-eastern Europe, Hungary and Austria)
Nikolsky's adder, Vipera nikolskii (Ukraine)
Meadow viper, Vipera renardi (Russia)
Magnificent viper, Vipera magnifica  (Russia)
Orlov's viper, Vipera orlovi  (Russia)
Lotiev's viper, Vipera lotievi  (Russia, Georgia)
Caucasus subalpine viper, Vipera dinniki  (Russia, Georgia)
Milos viper, Macrovipera schweizeri  (Islands of Milos, Kimolos, Polyaigos, Sifnos)
Blunt-nosed viper, Macrovipera lebetina (southern Russia, Cyprus in Asia - Greece, Turkey)
Subfamily: Crotalinae
Halys pit viper, Gloydius halys (Russia, Kazakhstan) and:
Karaganda pit viper, Gloydius caraganus  (Kazakhstan, Russia)

See also
List of European amphibians
List of European birds
List of European mammals
List of extinct animals of Europe
List of reptiles of Turkey
List of reptiles of Caucasus region

Further reading
Arnold N., Ovenden D., Collins Field Guide, Reptiles & Amphibians Britain & Europe, HarperCollinsPublishers, London, 2002, 
Engelmann W., Fritzsche J., Günthner R., Obst F., Beobachten und bestimmen, Lurche und Kriechtiere Europas, Neumann Verlag, Leipzig, Radebeul, 1985

Notes

References

External links 
 The Reptile Database
 Snakes of Europe, a wikibook

 Europe